{{DISPLAYTITLE:C30H50O5}}
The molecular formula C30H50O5 (molar mass: 490.71 g/mol, exact mass: 490.3658 u) may refer to:

 Balsaminapentaol
 Cycloastragenol
 Eldecalcitol, an analog of Vitamin D